The 2003–04 Vermont Catamounts season was their second season in the  ECAC Division I. Led by head coach Dennis Miller, the Catamounts had 6 victories, compared to 25 defeats and 3 ties. Their conference record was 2 victories, 15 defeats and 1 tie.

Regular season

Schedule

Team records
Team Single Game Record, Most Goals Allowed (13) vs. Harvard (L, 13-0) 11/8/03
Team Single Game Record, Most Opp. Shots On Goal, (68), at Wisconsin (L, 2-0)10/10/03
Team Single Game Goaltending Record, Most Saves (66), at Wisconsin (10/10/03 - L, 2-0)
Team Single Season Goaltending Record, Most Saves, 1372, 2003–04
Individual Single Game Goaltending Record, Most Saves (66), Kami Cote at Wisconsin (10/10/03)
Individual Single Season Record, Most Goals - D-I, 11, Hilary Johnson (2003–04)
Individual Single Season Record, Most Penalty Minutes, 54, Becky Daley (2003–04)
Individual Single Season Goaltending Record, Most Saves, 1,332, Kami Cote (2003–04)
Individual Single Season Goaltending Record, Most Games Played, 34, Kami Cote (2003–04)

References

Vermont Catamounts Women's Ice Hockey Season, 2003-04
Vermont Catamounts women's ice hockey seasons
Vermont Catamounts women's ice
Vermont Catamounts women's ice